Ricky Evans (born 29 July 1990) is an English professional darts player who plays in Professional Darts Corporation events.

Career
From 2007 to 2012 Evans attempted to qualify for each BDO World Championship but was unsuccessful.
In 2011, Evans won a PDC Youth Tour event by beating David Coyne 4–1 in the final. He has played in the World Masters five times with his best finish coming in 2012 where he lost in the last 48 to James Wilson.

In 2013, Evans played in the Qualifying School to earn a tour card for the Professional Darts Corporation events and succeeded on the first day. Less than two months later he reached the quarter-finals of a PDC Pro Tour event for the first time by beating Gary Anderson 6–5 in the last 16 of the second UK Open Qualifier, before he lost 6–3 to Peter Wright. This saw him enter the UK Open in the second round stage where he was defeated 5–2 by Joe Cullen. Evans won through to the final of the World Under-21 World Championship which was played on the finals night of the Premier League Darts at the O2 Arena in London, with Evans losing 6–1 to Michael Smith. However, the result was enough to see him reach the Grand Slam of Darts for the first time, but he lost each of his Group E games to Raymond van Barneveld, Mervyn King and Tony O'Shea to finish bottom of the table.

Evans advanced to his first final in main PDC events at the 13th Players Championship of the year. He beat established players such as Gary Anderson, Ronnie Baxter, Jamie Caven and Ian White, before losing 6–3 against Brendan Dolan. Evans' successful debut season continued later in the month as he was a losing semi-finalist at the final Players Championship. He amassed £11,550 in ProTour events during the year which saw him qualify through the Order of Merit for his first PDC World Championship where he outplayed the experienced Baxter in the first round to win 3–0 in sets. Evans next faced 14th seed Mervyn King but ultimately fell to the veteran 4–2 in sets. After the match King praised Evans' performance and described him as "the future of our sport". Evans was ranked world number 56 after his debut season on the PDC tour.

He could not get beyond the last 128 in any of the six qualifiers for the 2014 UK Open, which resulted in his failure to qualify for the event. Evans' form improved as the year progressed by qualifying for the final two European Tour events. At the European Darts Grand Prix he beat Jelle Klaasen 6–3, but lost 6–5 against Vincent van der Voort in the second round and at the European Darts Trophy he was eliminated in the first round 6–5 by Klaasen. In November, Evans reached the last 16 for the only time this year at the 20th and final Players Championship where he lost 6–3 to Ian White.

At the second UK Open Qualifier of 2015, Evans progressed through to his first quarter-final in over a year where he lost 6–3 to Vincent van der Voort. He reached the third round of the UK Open for the first time by beating Mark Layton 5–3, but then lost 9–4 to James Wilson. A second quarter-final appearance this year came at the fifth Players Championship where, after defeating Colin Osborne, Andy Smith, Jamie Robinson and Devon Petersen, he lost 6–2 to Keegan Brown.

Evans won the qualifier for the 2016 World Championship with a 5–4 victory over Andy Boulton. He played 2010 runner-up Simon Whitlock in the first round and, having trailed 2–0 in sets and 2–0 in legs (surviving two match darts), Evans mounted a comeback to eventually win the match 3–2 with a 130 checkout. However, Evans lost 10 legs in a row in his second round match against Jamie Caven to be knocked out 4–0. A 9–5 victory over Andy Boulton saw Evans play in the fourth round of the UK Open for the first time, but he missed match darts against Darren Webster to lose 9–8 after leading 4–1 early on. A quarter-final appearance came at the seventh Players Championship event (lost 6–2 to Gerwyn Price) and he went one better at the 16th event to reach his first semi-final in nearly three years. He also missed double 12 for a nine darter during the day, before losing 6–4 to Steve West in the last four. These results have seen Evans qualify for the Players Championship Finals and he faced James Wade in the first round.

Evans' first round match with Michael Smith at the 2017 World Championship went to a deciding set in which he failed to win a leg to be beaten 3–2. He reached the semi-finals of the first UK Open Qualifier, but lost 6–4 to Adrian Lewis.

At the 2018 Dutch Darts Championship, Evans made his first PDC European Tour final, where he lost 8–5 to Ian White.

In 2019, he followed that up with another runner-up spot at Players Championship 6 before reaching his second European Tour final at the 2019 German Darts Championship, where he lost 8–6 to Daryl Gurney.

Playing style
Evans is known for his incredible dart throwing speed, and has been described by Sky pundit Wayne Mardle as the quickest player he's ever seen. Evans will usually throw three darts within three to five seconds of approaching the oche unless changing position or going for a double, a trait which has led to his nickname of 'Rapid'.

During the 2017 World Championship, Evans hit a 180 in just 2.16 seconds during his first round match against Michael Smith.

World Championship Performances

PDC
 2014: Second round (lost to Mervyn King 2–4)
 2016: Second round (lost to Jamie Caven 0–4)
 2017: First round (lost to Michael Smith 2–3)
 2019: First round (lost to Rowby-John Rodriguez 1–3)
 2020: Third round (lost to Michael van Gerwen 0–4)
 2021: Third round (lost to Michael van Gerwen 0–4)
 2022: Second round (lost to Daryl Gurney 1–3)
 2023: Second round (lost to Joe Cullen 1–3)

Performance timeline

 

PDC European Tour

References

External links

1990 births
Living people
Professional Darts Corporation current tour card holders
English darts players